Mr. Belvedere Goes to College is a 1949 American comedy film directed by Elliott Nugent. The screenplay written by Mary Loos, Mary C. McCall, Jr., and Richard Sale was based on characters created by Gwen Davenport. It follows on from Sitting Pretty (1948), and had a sequel, Mr. Belvedere Rings the Bell (1951). The film focuses on prickly genius Lynn Belvedere (Clifton Webb) who enrolls in a major university with the intention of obtaining a four-year degree in only one year.

Plot 
Lynn Belvedere, though the successful author of a scandalous, best-selling book titled Hummingbird Hill (as described in Sitting Pretty), has not benefited financially, as he has had to fight many libel suits as a result. He has been awarded a literary prize from a foundation. One requirement for the $10,000 prize is that he be a college graduate.

To meet that requirement, Belvedere decides to enroll at Clemens University. The president of the university allows him to do so, on condition that he not do anything publicly detrimental to the institution. Belvedere intends to complete the four-year program in a single year, even though he has no formal education. He passes the entrance exams with flying colors because he is a self-taught genius.

He is assigned to share a dorm room with freshman Corny Whittaker and bossy sophomore Avery Brubaker. A fellow student who writes for the school paper, Ellen Baker, wants to interview him, but he declines.

Belvedere gets a job as a food server at a sorority house from student job coordinator Bill Chase. Bill is interested in Ellen, and later at a dinner he introduces her to his mother, who is in charge of the sorority. Belvedere corrects the girls' behavior and etiquette at dinner.

Belvedere is punished for shaving during "Whisker Week": he has to wear a fake beard until further notice. Ellen takes a photo of him in the beard for an article she is writing. The article includes quotes from Belvedere that displease the university greatly, even though Belvedere states they were not intended for publication and plans to sue Ellen and the university. Instead, Belvedere advises Ellen not to publish pure gossip in future and not to submit another, longer article to Look magazine.

As the relationship between Bill and Ellen deepens, she introduces him to her young son, Davy. She tells Bill that she is a war widow. He is taken aback, but after thinking it over, he decides he loves her, they reconcile, and become engaged.

When Ellen gets a cool reception from Bill's mother, she believes that Belvedere has told Mrs. Chase about her son. She decides to send her article about Belvedere to the magazine after all. Bill pleads with her not to, but she refuses to listen. Belvedere tries to talk to her, but she will not let him in. He sneaks in through the window. The police find him in her apartment and arrest him, believing he is a Peeping Tom. Belvedere is released when Ellen drops the charges. He then arranges for her to make up with Bill.

Belvedere not only completes his degree in one year, he is the class valedictorian. In the final scene, as the President of Clemens hands Belvedere his degree, he hands the president a rolled up magazine. He unrolls it to learn that it is a copy of Look ... with a photo of Mr. Belvedere receiving his degree on the cover and as the lead article. Belvedere then breaks the fourth wall and smiles knowingly at the audience.

Cast
 Clifton Webb as Lynn Belvedere
 Shirley Temple as Ellen Baker
 Tom Drake as Bill Chase
 Alan Young as Avery Brubaker
 Jessie Royce Landis as Mrs. Chase
 Kathleen Hughes as Kay Nelson
 Taylor Holmes as Dr. Gibbs, the dean of the university
 Alvin Greenman as Cornelius Whittaker
 Paul Harvey as Dr. Keating, the president of the university
 Barry Kelley as Police Sergeant Griggs
 Robert Patten as Joe Fisher
 Jeff Chandler as Pratt
 Kathleen Freeman as Gwendolyn (uncredited)

Production
Jeff Chandler has a small role. He says he played "the bigger of two cops".

References

External links
 
 
 
 Review of film at Variety

1949 films
1949 comedy films
20th Century Fox films
American black-and-white films
American comedy films
American sequel films
Films directed by Elliott Nugent
Films scored by Alfred Newman
Films set in universities and colleges
Films shot in Nevada
1940s English-language films
1940s American films